

Laguna Colorada (Red Lagoon) is a shallow salt lake in the southwest of the altiplano of Bolivia, within Eduardo Avaroa Andean Fauna National Reserve and close to the border with Chile.

Contents
The lake contains borax islands, whose white color contrasts with the reddish color of its waters, which is caused by red sediments and pigmentation of some algae.

Geography
Laguna Colorada is part of the Los Lípez (formerly Laguna Colorada) Ramsar wetland. It was listed as a "Ramsar Wetland of International Importance" in 1990.

Fauna
James's flamingos abound in the area. It is also possible to find Andean and Chilean flamingos, but in lesser quantities.

See also

Laguna Verde
Mount Nelly

References

External links

 Photo of Laguna Colorada on National Geographic's website

Lakes of Potosí Department
Ramsar sites in Bolivia
Saline lakes of South America